"Stargirl Interlude" is a song by Canadian singer the Weeknd featuring American singer-songwriter Lana Del Rey. Dubbed as an "interlude", the track comes from the Weeknd's third studio album, Starboy (2016). The track's title itself is a direct reference to the album's titular character, Starboy, with the lyrics focusing in on a female counterpart, similarly named Stargirl. The song was written by the artists alongside producers Martin "Doc" McKinney and Labrinth, It is the third of the four collaborations between the two artists, being followed by the title track from Lana Del Rey's fifth studio album Lust for Life (2017).

Background
Having been friends since 2012, Del Rey and the Weeknd had previously collaborated on his 2015 track, "Prisoner" from his album, Beauty Behind the Madness. Following this, the two collaborated again in several studio sessions in 2015, resulting in the Starboy tracks "Stargirl Interlude" and "Party Monster", the latter of which Del Rey co-wrote and was an uncredited vocalist for.

Commercial performance
Following the release of Starboy, several of the non-single tracks from the album debuted on numerous music charts, with "Stargirl" peaking at 61 on the US Billboard Hot 100 and 73 on the UK Singles Chart. The song additionally appeared on the Billboard Hot R&B Songs chart, peaking at number 21. In 2022, "Stargirl Interlude" saw an increase in consumption as the song went viral on the social media platform TikTok alongside fellow album track "Die for You". This increase in streaming and sales lead to the song's parent album to re-enter the top 40 on the Billboard 200 chart, as well as the song itself to receive recognition as the most streamed interlude on Spotify, an accomplishment celebrated by The Weeknd himself.

Charts

Weekly charts

Year-end charts

Certifications

References

2016 songs
Lana Del Rey songs
The Weeknd songs
Songs written by Lana Del Rey
Songs written by the Weeknd
Songs written by Labrinth
Songs written by Doc McKinney